David Charles Lucas (born March 22, 1932) is a Canadian retired professional ice hockey defencemen who played in one National Hockey League game for the Detroit Red Wings during the 1962–63 season. The rest of his career, which lasted from 1952 to 1969, was mainly spent with the Johnstown Jets of the minor Eastern Hockey League. Lucas scouted for the Pittsburgh Penguins, the NHL Central Scouting Bureau, and the Chicago Blackhawks.

Career statistics

Regular season and playoffs

See also
 List of players who played only one game in the NHL

External links
 

1932 births
Living people
Canadian expatriate ice hockey players in the United States
Canadian ice hockey defencemen
Chicago Blackhawks scouts
Detroit Red Wings players
Johnstown Jets players
Pittsburgh Hornets players
Pittsburgh Penguins scouts
Portland Buckaroos players
Salem Rebels (EHL) players
Southern Hockey League (1973–1977) coaches
Sportspeople from Kawartha Lakes
Troy Bruins players